|}

The Concorde Stakes is a Group 3 flat horse race in Ireland open to thoroughbreds aged three years or older. It is run at Tipperary over a distance of 7 furlongs and 100 yards (1,500 metres), and it is scheduled to take place each year in early October.

History
The event was formerly contested at Phoenix Park over a distance of 1 mile. For a period it was held in June or July. It was transferred to Tipperary in 1991, and moved to early October in 1995. It was staged at Cork in 1999 and 2000.

The Concorde Stakes currently takes place at a meeting which features both flat and jump races. It is run on the same afternoon as the Istabraq Hurdle.

Records
Most successful horse since 1983 (2 wins):
 Kings River – 1985, 1986
 Wizard King – 1996, 1997
 Yulong Gold Fairy -  2018,2019 

Leading jockey since 1983 (5 wins):
 Michael Kinane – Kings River (1985, 1986), Executive Perk (1989), Rami (1992), Eastern Appeal (2007)

Leading trainer since 1983 (11 wins):
 Dermot Weld – Iron Leader (1983), Kings River (1985, 1986), Executive Perk (1989), Rami (1992), Two-Twenty-Two (1998), Tarry Flynn (1999), Emulous (2010), Anam Allta (2011), Yellow Rosebud (2012), Big Break (2013)

Winners since 1983

See also
 Horse racing in Ireland
 List of Irish flat horse races

References
 Racing Post:

 galopp-sieger.de – Concorde Stakes.
 horseracingintfed.com – International Federation of Horseracing Authorities – Concorde Stakes (2018).
 irishracinggreats.com – Concorde Stakes (Group 3).
 pedigreequery.com – Concorde Stakes – Tipperary.

Flat races in Ireland
Open mile category horse races
Tipperary Racecourse